Arnaud Tonus (born 27 June 1991) is a Swiss professional motocross racer.

References

External links
 Arnaud Tonus at MXGP web site
 

Living people
1991 births
Swiss motocross riders
Sportspeople from Geneva